

The Besson MB.36 was a French monoplane flying-boat designed by Marcel Besson, only one was built.

Design and development
The MB.36 was a parasol-wing monoplane flying-boat for use as either a bomber or commercial transport. It was powered by three  Gnome-Rhône 9Ad Jupiter radial engines. The prototype, registered F-AKEJ, was a 10-seat commercial variant, designed in 1926 but did not fly until 15 May 1930 because of financial difficulties. By the time of the MB.36 first flight, the company had been taken over by the ANF Mureaux company. After the flying-boat lost a stabilizing float during official tests, and because of poor performance the project was abandoned and the MB.36 scrapped.

Specifications

See also

References

Notes

Bibliography

1930s French airliners
Flying boats
MB.36
Trimotors
Parasol-wing aircraft
Aircraft first flown in 1930